The 2017 Fremantle Football Club season is the 23rd season in the Australian Football League contested by the Fremantle Football Club.

List changes

Retirements and delistings

Free agency

Trades

National draft

Rookie draft

Squad

Season summary

Pre-season

Home and Away season

Ladder

References

Fremantle Football Club seasons
Fremantle